International Journal of Heat and Mass Transfer is a peer-reviewed scientific journal in the field of heat transfer and mass transfer, published by Elsevier. The editor-in-chief is T. S. Zhao (Hong Kong University of Science and Technology).

Abstracting and indexing
The journal is abstracted and indexed in:

According to the Journal Citation Reports, the journal has a 2020 impact factor of 5.584.

References

External links
 

Physics journals
English-language journals
Engineering journals
Elsevier academic journals
Publications established in 1960
Monthly journals